Alex Rocco (born Alessandro Federico Petricone Jr.; February 29, 1936 – July 18, 2015) was an American actor. Known for his distinctive, gravelly voice, he was often cast as villains, including Moe Greene in The Godfather (1972) and his Primetime Emmy Award-winning role in The Famous Teddy Z. Rocco did a significant amount of voice-over work later in his career.

Early life
Rocco was born as Alessandro Federico Petricone, Jr., in Cambridge, Massachusetts, in 1936, and raised in nearby Somerville, the son of an Italian immigrant, Mary (née DiBiase; 1909–1978) and Alessandro Sam Petricone (1896–1949), a native of Gaeta, Italy. Rocco served in the California Army National Guard during the Korean War.

Criminal activity and arrests 
In January 1960, Petricone was one of 28 persons indicted by a Middlesex County grand jury in a gambling case, and in September 1961, he was arrested along with James McLean and others on charges related to an assault on the owner of a diner in Somerville, and the wrecking of his establishment, the previous August.

According to organized crime turncoat Vincent Teresa, Rocco was a hanger-on with the Winter Hill Gang of the Boston area. An unwanted advance toward Petricone's then-girlfriend on Labor Day 1961, touched off the Boston Irish Gang War of the 1960s. Georgie McLaughlin, who made the advance, was beaten by Winter Hill Gang members.

Rocco, then known as Alexander F. Petricone, was arrested in Charlestown on October 31, 1961, along with McLean on suspicion of murder following the death of Bernie McLaughlin of the Charlestown Mob, the first murder of the war. He was working as a bartender at the time.

A witness claimed that Petricone was the driver of the getaway car, and he and McLean were formally charged in the slaying on November 1, 1961.   Petricone  and McLean were released  after a grand jury found a lack of evidence, but both served a prison term for the diner wrecking.  In 1962, while in prison, his wife's car was bombed. Police believed the bomb was intended for Howie Winter, head of the Winter Hill Gang, who had driven the car to her earlier.

Acting career
After completing his prison term for the diner assault, Petricone and his wife divorced and he moved to California. He later recounted, "I had to get out of Boston, so I flipped a coin and said 'Heads, Miami, tails, California'." He began taking acting lessons from actor Leonard Nimoy, a fellow Boston native. Nimoy worked with him to eliminate his heavy Boston accent and had him take speech lessons. Rocco followed through with Nimoy's instructions, and started working in the film industry, adopting the name "Alex Rocco" after seeing the "Rocco" on a bakery truck.

His first film role was in Russ Meyer's Motorpsycho! in 1965.

In 1972, Rocco played the part of Moe Greene, a Las Vegas casino owner, in Coppola's The Godfather. Greene's character represented the top Jewish mobster in Las Vegas; although he sought an Italian role, director Francis Ford Coppola remarked "I got my Jew!" on seeing Rocco. The same year, Rocco returned to the Boston area to play a bank robber in the film The Friends of Eddie Coyle. He set up a meeting between Robert Mitchum and local Irish-American gangsters to help Mitchum research his part as Eddie Coyle, a low-level Irish-American criminal. Rocco introduced Mitchum to Howie Winter, leader of the Winter Hill Gang. Another Winter Hill Gang member who met with Mitchum was Johnny Martorano, who had murdered Billy O'Brien, a low-level gangster.

In the fall of 1975, Rocco starred as Pete Karras, a widowed father, writer, and photographer, in the 12-week CBS drama series Three for the Road, with Vincent Van Patten as his older son, John Karras, and Leif Garrett as his younger son, Endy Karras. After the death of their wife and mother, the Karrases sell their house, buy a recreational vehicle, and roam throughout the United States. In the long-running, 1980s TV series The Facts of Life, Rocco played Charlie Polniaczek, Jo's father. In 1989, he played Gus Keller in the Corey Feldman and Corey Haim movie Dream a Little Dream. In the period 1989–90, Rocco was a regular on the television comedy series The Famous Teddy Z as Al Floss, a Hollywood talent agent. He received an Emmy Award as Best Supporting Actor in a Comedy Series for this role in 1990. In 1995, Rocco appeared as Jimmy Cap, a tough Miami mob boss, in the John Travolta mob comedy, Get Shorty. In 1997, he appeared, along with Rodney Dangerfield and others, in the annual Thanksgiving episode of the ABC sitcom Home Improvement.

In the 1996 film That Thing You Do!, Rocco had a cameo part as Sol Siler, the founder of Playtone Records, a performance that was rated by The Observer'''s critic as his "favorite [part] in the movie." Rocco appeared  as Salvatore in the 2001 film The Wedding Planner, and (uncredited) in the action thriller Smokin' Aces.

Rocco had a recurring voiceover part in the long-running animated series The Simpsons as the head of Itchy and Scratchy Studios, Roger Meyers Jr. In the DVD commentaries, Rocco expressed true gratitude to The Simpsons staff for allowing him his first voiceover role. He did further voice work on two early episodes of the Fox hit sitcom, Family Guy and on the 1998 Disney/Pixar film A Bug's Life. He deemed the latter to have been his "greatest prize in life," since he was paid $1 million to record eight lines.

In 2008, Rocco starred in the Super Bowl commercial for the Audi R8 supercar. The commercial was inspired by The Godfather. He played a rich man who finds the front fascia of his luxury car in his bed, a nod to the scene from the original movie in which Jack Woltz, a rich movie producer, finds the head of his prized racehorse in his bed. He was also featured on the Starz cable channel's crime-drama series, Magic City. His last role was in the 2010s BBC2 TV series Episodes'', playing the "curmudgeonly" father of Matt LeBlanc's character.

Personal life, death and funeral
After moving to Los Angeles, Rocco became a member of the Baháʼí Faith, and he appeared in a number of productions related to the religion over the years. He also thanked Baháʼu'lláh, the Prophet Founder of the Baháʼí Faith in his Emmy Award acceptance speech.

His first marriage was to Grace Petricone, and they had one daughter, Maryann.

After moving to California, he married Sandra Elaine Rocco (September 1, 1942 – June 12, 2002) on March 24, 1964. He adopted her son, Marc King, who became known as Marc Rocco (June 19, 1962 – May 1, 2009), a film producer, screenwriter, and director. The couple had two children, a daughter Jennifer and a son, Lucien, and one grandson. Sandra Rocco died of cancer, aged 59.

Rocco married Shannon Wilcox, on October 15, 2005.

Alex Rocco died on July 18, 2015, from pancreatic cancer in his Studio City home, at the age of 79.

Filmography

Film

Television

References

External links

1936 births
2015 deaths
People of Lazian descent
American male film actors
American people of Italian descent
American male television actors
American male voice actors
Deaths from cancer in California
Deaths from pancreatic cancer
Male actors from Boston
American Bahá'ís
American former Christians 
Outstanding Performance by a Supporting Actor in a Comedy Series Primetime Emmy Award winners
People from Somerville, Massachusetts
Winter Hill Gang
21st-century Bahá'ís
Former Roman Catholics 
20th-century American male actors
21st-century American male actors